The Tejipió River is a river of Pernambuco state in Brazil. The river forms the boundary between Recife and Jaboatão dos Guararapes.

See also
List of rivers of Pernambuco

References
Brazilian Ministry of Transport

Rivers of Pernambuco